Huaylas Quechua is an Ancash Quechua dialect spoken in the Callejón de Huaylas and in the western slope of the Cordillera Negra.

The main peculiarities of this variety are phonetic. In Quechua Ancash-Huailas a phenomenon of monophthongation of syllables with semiconsonants in coda is present: "aw" is often pronounced as [o:] elongated, likewise "ay" as [e:]. For example, 'awmi' is pronounced [o: mi],  chawpi  (center) [t͡ʃo: pi] and  aywan  (walks) as [e: wan]. In grammatical terms, Huaylas lacks the suffix  -ski .

Bibliography

References 

Quechuan languages